El Paredón is a corregimiento in Ngäbe-Buglé Comarca in the Republic of Panama.

References 

 

Populated places in Ngöbe-Buglé Comarca